Mersin İdmanyurdu (also Mersin İdman Yurdu, Mersin İY, or MİY) Sports Club; located in Mersin, east Mediterranean coast of Turkey in 2001–02. It was the first season in Turkish football league system that a single group second division was introduced with name of Second League Category A. The continuation of Turkish Second Football League was renamed as Second League Category B which was lowered to third layer accordingly. The team took place in first season of this division for the first time, and in Second League for 28th time since its foundation in 1963–64. Mersin İdmanyurdu S.K. has finished Second League Category B Promotion Group at second place in 2001–02 season and promoted to 2002–03 TFF First League.

Macit Özcan was club president. Nasır Belci managed the team during the season. Şafak Burak Bayman was the mostly appeared player as well as season top goalscorer.

2001–02 TFF Second League participation
Mersin İdmanyurdu took place in 2001–02 Second League Category B (which has been named as "Second League Category B" between 2001–02 and 2005–06; "TFF League B" in 2006–07 and "TFF Second League" since 2007–08 season). League was played by 50 teams in three stages. League was started on 19 August 2001. In the first stage teams fought in regionally specified five ranking groups (10 teams in each) for top two rankings to qualify for Promotion Group in the next stage. In the second stage 10 teams fought for promotion to 2002–03 Second League Category A. Champions and runners-up directly promoted. Remaining 8 teams played in Classification Groups. Classification group winners qualified for promotion play-offs, while bottom two teams relegated to 2002–03 TFF Third League. In the third stage, the third team was determined in promotion-play-offs played in one-leg elimination system in a neutral venue. Play-offs were played by 8 teams (three from promotion group, 5 from each classification groups) in Denizli Atatürk Stadium between 22 and 27 May 2002.

Mersin İdmanyurdu took place in 2001–02 Second League Category B Ranking Group 1 in the first stage and finished at top. In Promotion Group team finished at second place and gained direct promotion to 2002–03 Second League Category A.

Results summary
Mersin İdmanyurdu (MİY) 2001–02 Second League Category B season league summary:

Sources: 2001–02 TFF Second League pages.

Ranking group league table
Mersin İY's league performance in 2001–02 Second League Category B Ranking Group 1 season is shown in the following table.

Three points for a win. Rules for classification: 1) points; 2) tie-break; 3) goal difference; 4) number of goals scored. In the score columns first scores belong to MİY.
 (Q): Qualified for 2001–02 Second League Promotion Group.Source: 2001–02 TFF Second League pages from TFF website, Turkish-Soccer website, and Maçkolik website.

Ranking group games
Mersin İdmanyurdu (MİY) 2001–02 Second League Category B season first half game reports in Ranking Group 1 is shown in the following table.
Kick off times are in EET and EEST.

Sources: 2001–02 TFF Second League pages.

Promotion group league table
Mersin İY's league performance in 2001–02 Second League Category B Promotion Group season is shown in the following table.

Three points for a win. Rules for classification: 1) points; 2) tie-break; 3) goal difference; 4) number of goals scored. In the score columns first scores belong to MİY.(C): Champions;  (P): Promoted to 2002–03 Second League Category A;  (Q): Qualified for 2001–02 Promotion Play-offs.Source: 2001–02 TFF Second League pages from TFF website, Turkish-Soccer website, and Maçkolik website.

Promotion group games
Mersin İdmanyurdu (MİY) 2001–02 Second League Category B season first half game reports in Promotion Group is shown in the following table.
Kick off times are in EET and EEST.

Sources: 2001–02 TFF Second League pages.

2001–02 Turkish Cup participation
MİY did not participate in 2001–02 Turkish Cup due to eligibility rules. 40th Turkish Cup (played as "Türkiye Kupası") was played by 64 teams. Top four teams in previous year's classification groups qualified for the Cup from Round 1. Mersin İdmanyurdu had finished 2000–01 in 7th place and did not qualify. Cup was played in 4 rounds prior to quarterfinals. All rounds were played in one-leg elimination system. Kocaelispor won the cup for the 2nd time.

Management

Club management
Macit Özcan, mayor of Mersin city was president. Özcan was elected president in club congress after 18 April 1999 local elections. Mayors presided the club many times in its history.

Coaching team
Nasır Belci was head coach during the season.

2000–01 Mersin İdmanyurdu head coaches:

Note: Only official games were included.

2001–02 squad
Appearances, goals and cards count for 2001–02 Second League Category B Ranking and Promotion Groups games. 18 players appeared in each game roster, three to be replaced. Only the players who appeared in game rosters were included and listed in order of appearance.

Sources: TFF club page and maçkolik team page.

See also
 Football in Turkey
 2001–02 TFF Second League
 2001–02 Turkish Cup

Notes and references

Mersin İdman Yurdu seasons
Turkish football clubs 2001–02 season